Gomphroa remyi is a species of small air-breathing land snail, terrestrial pulmonate gastropod mollusk in the family Azecidae.

Distribution
This species is endemic to France and was found on Corsica.

References 

Azecidae
Gastropods described in 1949
Endemic molluscs of Metropolitan France
Taxobox binomials not recognized by IUCN